Diploglottis australis, known as the native tamarind, is a well known rainforest tree of eastern Australia. It is easily identified by the large sausage shaped leaflets.

The native tamarind grows in a variety of different rainforests, on basaltic and rich alluvial soils. The southernmost limit of natural distribution is Brogo near Bega (36° S) in New South Wales. They grow naturally along the east coast, northwards to near Proserpine (20° S) in tropical Queensland.

Description 

The tree is medium to large, with long and broad leaves. It can achieve a height of over 35 metres tall and a trunk diameter of 75 cm. The trunk is cylindrical and flanged at the base, somewhat resembling the trunk of the Coachwood.

The branches bear alternate leaves, which are large and pinnate with conspicuously large leaflets. The leaf is generally 40–120 cm long and leaves on mature branches bear about 6–12 leaflets each, but on seedlings or coppice shoots the leaves may be simple or bear only 3–5 leaflets. The leaflets commonly are 10–30 cm long and 4–8 cm wide, broadly oblong to elliptic, bluntly pointed at the tip, not equal at the base, often covered with velvety golden brown hairs. The leaf veins are easy to see on both sides, more so on the underside. The midrib is slightly raised on the top surface.

Flowers form in spring, being creamy brown in large and hairy panicles. The brown and hairy capsule matures from October to January. It contains a yellow/orange aril, which is pleasant to the taste. Within the aril is a triangular, pale brown seed.

Seed germination is reliable and fast, although seed collected from damp ground where it falls in large quantity, generally is heavily infested with insect grubs. Many species of rainforest birds eat the fruit, particularly the aril, and disseminate the seed. Prominent examples of such birds include the brown cuckoo dove, crimson rosella, Australasian figbird, green catbird, regent bowerbird, Australian brush-turkey, rose-crowned fruit-dove, topknot pigeon and wompoo fruit-dove.

Taxonomy
An involved naming history exists for this species. At all events, Diploglottis australis  has received support and clarification as the currently accepted name, rather than the synonym of D. cunninghamii.

Uses 
The native tamarind is grown as a decorative tree in various parts of urban Australia, including behind the Mitchell Library in the city of Sydney. However, the tree is ill-suited to situations where strong winds damage its large leaflets.

The native tamarind is valued as an indigenous fruit tree because the aril may be eaten raw or added to jams and chutneys. It also is used as the basis for a tangy cool drink.

References

Sapindales of Australia
Trees of Australia
Ornamental trees
Flora of Queensland
Flora of New South Wales
australis